The women's team pursuit competition at the 2018 Asian Games was held on 27 and 28 August at the Jakarta International Velodrome.

Schedule
All times are Western Indonesia Time (UTC+07:00)

Records

Results

Qualifying

First round

Heat 1

Heat 2

Heat 3

Summary

Finals

Bronze

Gold

References

Track Women Team pursuit